Srna, sRNA, or SRNA may refer to:

 Darijo Srna (born 1982), Croatian footballer
 small RNA, abbreviated as sRNA, a class of ribonucleic acid molecule
 soluble RNA, abbreviated as sRNA (now called transfer RNA, abbreviated as tRNA), an adaptor molecule composed of ribonucleic acid
 Student Registered Nurse Anesthetist, a nursing qualification
 , a news agency of Republika Srpska, part of the media of Bosnia and Herzegovina